Facemelter is the twelfth studio album by American hard rock/heavy metal band Y&T. It was released on May 21, 2010 through the Frontiers Records label. It is their first album since the release of Endangered Species in 1997, the longest gap to date between two Y&T studio albums. This is the final Y&T album to feature bassist Phil Kennemore, who died of cancer the following year. 17 songs were written for the album, of which 15 were placed on the album. The follow up to Facemelter, which would be Y&T's 13th studio album, is to be released before 2020 according to Dave Meniketti. I'm Coming Home was accompanied by a music video.

Track listing

Personnel
 Dave Meniketti – Lead Vocals, Lead Guitar
 John Nymann – Guitar, backing vocals, Solo on :"I Want Your Money" & 2nd solo on "Blind Patriot"
 Phil Kennemore – Bass Guitar, backing vocals
 Mike Vanderhule – Drums & Percussion, backing vocals

Charts

References

Y&T albums
2010 albums
Frontiers Records albums